Burpee may refer to:

Burpee (exercise), a full body exercise 
Burpee Seeds, a seed company
Hanksville-Burpee Quarry, a paleontological excavation site near Hanksville, Utah
Burpee Museum of Natural History
Burpee and Mills, Ontario, a township

It is also a name:
W. Atlee Burpee, founder of Burpee Seeds
Lawrence Johnstone Burpee (1873–1946), Canadian librarian, historian and author
Judson Burpee Black (1842–1924), Canadian politician
Burpee L. Steeves (1868–1933), Lieutenant Governor of Idaho from 1905 to 1907